Troels Gustavsen from Sakskøbing, Denmark, born in 1988 is a Danish singer/songwriter who released his first studio album titled Soon in March 2007 on the indie label "NoobFactory" and on "A:larm Music" (for distribution). It included his single "Time (Blue Signs)", a personal song about the loss of his father 2 years earlier. Other songs in Soon included "Christopher", "Hey Dreamer" and "Dried Out".

In Noah

In 2011, he carved a partnership with Lasse Dyrholm to form the duo Noah (duo). The duo had chart success with their first single (released in January 2012) "Alt er forbi" that reached #14 on Tracklisten, the official Danish Singles Chart. The follow up single "Over byen" reached #8. The duo is planning on releasing a full studio album in 2013.

Discography
For Troels Gustavsen's discography as part of Noah, see Noah (duo)

Albums
2007: Soon

Track list:
"Dreamer (3:03)
"Times (Blue Signs)" (3:41)
"Let's Get Surprised" (3:39)
"Soon" (3:34)
"Christopher" (3:46)
"River" (3:27)
"Dried Out" (3:49)
"Adam Lost His Eve" (2:57)
"Easy Come, Easy Go" (3:15)
"Gently" (3:38)
"This Is Who I Am" (3:35)
"Shape of Destiny" (2:40)

Singles
2007: "Times (Blue Signs)"

References

External links
Troels Gustavsen MySpace

Danish male singers
1988 births
Living people
21st-century Danish male singers